Iron County Courthouse is a historic courthouse complex located in Ironton, Iron County, Missouri. In 1979 the courthouse, along with several associated buildings, was listed on the National Register of Historic Places. The complex consists of the two-story, red brick Italianate / Greek Revival style courthouse (1858); an octagonal, frame gazebo (1899); and two-story, brick sheriff's house and connecting stone jail (c. 1866–1867). The courthouse measure approximately 65 feet by 47 feet, 3 inches and sits on a limestone block foundation. It is topped by a gable roof with cupola and features round arched windows.

References

County courthouses in Missouri
Courthouses on the National Register of Historic Places in Missouri
Italianate architecture in Missouri
Greek Revival architecture in Missouri
Government buildings completed in 1858
Buildings and structures in Iron County, Missouri
National Register of Historic Places in Iron County, Missouri
1858 establishments in Missouri